A bean is a large seed of several plants in the family Fabaceae.

Bean or beans may also refer to:

Arts and entertainment

Mr. Bean, a British television series
Bean (film), a 1997 comedy film based on the television series
Beans (2000 film), a Turkish comedy mafia film
Beans (2020 film), a Canadian drama
Beans (band), an Italian pop musical group
"Bean (Kobe)", a 2020 song by rapper Lil Uzi Vert
"Bean", a song from the 1995 album La Mia Vita Violenta by Blonde Redhead
"The Bean", a nickname of Cloud Gate, a sculpture in Chicago, United States
"The Bean", a nickname of Cloud Column, a sculpture in Houston, United States
"bean" or "beans", a humorous name given by fans to the crewmates in the 2018 video game Among Us due to their resemblance to a bean or a Jelly bean

People and fictional characters
Bean (name), a list of people and fictional characters with the surname or nickname
Fred D. Beans (1906–1980), United States Marine Corps brigadier general
James D. Beans (born 1934), United States Marine Corps brigadier general, son of Fred Beans
Beans (rapper) (Robert Edward Stewart II, born 1971)

Places

United States
Bean Creek (Zayante Creek tributary), California
Bean Creek (Salt River tributary), Missouri
Bean Lake (Cottonwood County, Minnesota)
Bean Lake (Missouri)
Bean River, New Hampshire

Elsewhere
Division of Bean, Australian Capital Territory, an electoral division
Bean, Kent, England

Other uses
Bean (software), a word processor for Mac OS X
Walkman Bean, a portable media player
BEAN (charity), an American volunteering organization
Bean Cars, an early British car company

See also

Beane (disambiguation)
Been (disambiguation)
L.L.Bean, an American retailer of outdoor gear and apparel
Beanball, in baseball, a ball thrown with the intention of striking an opposing player
Beantown, a nickname of Boston, Massachusetts, U.S., the home of Boston baked beans
JavaBeans, reusable software components used in Java programming